

Portugal
 Angola – 
 Paulo Caetano de Albuquerque, Governor of Angola (1726–1732)
 Temporarily vacant (1732–1733)
 Macau –
 Antonio Moniz Barreto, Governor of Macau (1727–1732)
 Antonio de Amaral Meneses, Governor of Macau (1732–1735)

Colonial governors
Colonial governors
1732